Belview is a city in Redwood County, Minnesota, United States. The population was 384 at the 2010 census.

History
 A post office called Belview has been in operation since 1887. Belview was platted in 1889. The name Belview is derived from the French language, meaning "beautiful view". Belview was incorporated in 1893.

Geography

Belview lies at the intersection of County Roads 7 and 9:
County Road 7 runs north–south, connecting Belview with Sacred Heart to the north and Seaforth to the south. Minnesota State Highways 19 and 67 lie a few miles south of Belview at an intersection with County Road 7.
County Road 9 runs east–west, connecting Belview with Delhi to the east and Echo to the west.

Demographics

2010 census
As of the census of 2010, there were 384 people, 169 households, and 91 families living in the city. The racial makeup of the city was 98.2% White, 0.5% Asian, and 1.3% from two or more races. Hispanic or Latino of any race were 0.3% of the population.

There were 169 households, of which 24.3% had children under the age of 18 living with them, 42.0% were married couples living together, 7.1% had a female householder with no husband present, 4.7% had a male householder with no wife present, and 46.2% were non-families. 40.8% of all households were made up of individuals, and 30.2% had someone living alone who was 65 years of age or older. The average household size was 2.12 and the average family size was 2.87.

The median age in the city was 48.6 years. 18.2% of residents were under the age of 18; 8.1% were between the ages of 18 and 24; 18.2% were from 25 to 44; 24.5% were from 45 to 64; and 31% were 65 years of age or older. The gender makeup of the city was 45.1% male and 54.9% female.

2000 census
As of the census of 2000, there were 412 people, 155 households and 93 families living in the city. The racial makeup of the city was 98.06% White, 1.70% Asian, and 0.24% from two or more races.

There were 155 households, of which 29.7% had children under the age of 18 living with them, 45.8% were married couples living together, 9.0% had a female householder with no husband present, and 40.0% were non-families. 38.1% of all households were made up of individuals, and 25.8% had someone living alone who was 65 years of age or older. The average household size was 2.33 and the average family size was 3.13.

In the city, the population was spread out, with 23.1% under the age of 18, 5.3% from 18 to 24, 22.6% from 25 to 44, 15.3% from 45 to 64, and 33.7% who were 65 years of age or older. The median age was 44 years. For every 100 females, there were 89.0 males. For every 100 females age 18 and over, there were 82.2 males.

The median income for a household in the city was $32,500, and the median income for a family was $42,857. Males had a median income of $27,188 versus $22,500 for females. The per capita income for the city was $16,105. None of the families and 3.1% of the population were living below the poverty line, including no under eighteens and 6.7% of those over 64.

References

Cities in Minnesota
Cities in Redwood County, Minnesota